Robert Dodd (1748–1815) was a British marine painter and  aquatint engraver. He is known for his works on the French Revolutionary Wars.

Life and family
Born as one of three sons of Alexander Dodd, his younger brother was the engineer and painter Ralph Dodd.  He married Mary Fulton (b. 1748) on 1 November 1772. He died in early 1815 and was buried on 20 February at St Dunstan and All Saints, Stepney.

Style

Dodd started his career as a landscape painter, but after gaining some recognition in this field, specialised in marine scenes.  Living in Wapping, London, he had plenty of material to hand in the way of ships, docks and wharfs, and much of his work includes scenes of the River Thames and naval dockyards.  Other themes include battles and actions of the French Revolutionary Wars and the American War of Independence, prominently including a large canvas of the battle of the First of June for the dining room of his local inn, the Half Way House, in Commercial Road, London; the painting is now at the National Maritime Museum. Although much of his work was subsequently engraved by other artists, he also engraved and published over 100 aquatints of his own work. His use of light effects, particularly the contrasts between the sun's rays and the dark clouds, or the fire against the smoke of battle, convey the drama and activity of a sea battle. Although technically accurate and meticulous, his artistic talents were somewhat eclipsed by the greatest of his peers, and it is his contribution to the historical record that is his greatest legacy.

Exhibitions 

He exhibited at the Society of Artists in 1780 and the Royal Academy in 1782, continuing to exhibit there regularly until 1809.

References

External links 

 Works of Robert Dodd at the National Maritime Museum's online collections

18th-century English painters
English male painters
19th-century English painters
British marine artists
People from Wapping
1748 births
1815 deaths
19th-century English male artists
18th-century English male artists